Belkahve is a mountain pass in İzmir Province, Turkey.

It is the first point on the way from Central Anatolia to İzmir to watch İzmir and the Aegean Sea. During the Turkish War of Independence, after three years of occupation, the nationalists, including Atatürk, watched İzmir from this point on 8–9 September 1922. A monument has been erected to commemorate the incident.

References 

Mountain passes of Turkey
Landforms of İzmir Province
Aegean Region